Northern Rail, branded as Northern, was an English train operating company owned by Serco-Abellio that operated the Northern Rail franchise from 2004 until 2016. It was the primary passenger train operator in Northern England, and operated the most stations of any train operating company in the United Kingdom. Northern Rail was replaced on 1 April 2016 by Arriva Rail North.

History
In 2000 the Strategic Rail Authority announced that it planned to reorganise the North West Regional Railways and Regional Railways North East franchises operated by First North Western and Arriva Trains Northern. A TransPennine Express franchise would be created for the long-distance regional services, with the remaining services to be operated by a new Northern Rail franchise.

On 1 July 2004 the Strategic Rail Authority awarded the franchise to Serco-NedRailways, beating FirstGroup. The franchise was awarded for six years and nine months, with a two-year extension subject to performance targets being achieved.

Serco-NedRailways' bid had assumed that some Class 142 Pacer trains would be released imminently when Manchester Metrolink services started between Manchester and Oldham. Due to a substantial delay in extending the Metrolink, it became clear that this was not going to be the case. As a result, the contract signing was delayed, and the services operated by First North Western and Arriva Trains Northern did not transfer to Northern until 12 December 2004.

In May 2010 the Department for Transport confirmed that Northern had met the performance targets, and the franchise was extended for two years until September 2013. In May 2012 the Department for Transport granted Northern a six-month extension until 31 March 2014. In March 2013 the Secretary of State for Transport announced the franchise would be further extended to February 2016.

In August 2014, the Department for Transport announced Abellio, Arriva and Govia had been shortlisted to bid for the next franchise.

On 9 December 2015, it was announced that Arriva trading as Arriva Rail North had been awarded a new franchise to run from 1 April 2016 through to March 2025.

Before Abellio and Serco's Northern Rail franchise came to an end, unit 158906 received a refurbishment on one of its carriages which included free Wi-Fi, destination displays showing the expected time of arrival, and USB ports at each table.

Services

Additional services
The 10:17 service from Sheffield on Sundays continues to Carlisle creating a direct train service between Sheffield and Carlisle for the first time since the demise of British Rail. The service returns from Carlisle at 15:10.

In May 2015 Northern Rail announced the re-introduction of a direct service between Blackburn and Manchester Victoria via Burnley following the reopening of the Todmorden Curve. The service operates hourly, seven days a week.

Former services
Services on the route from Thorpes Bridge Junction, Newton Heath to Rochdale East Junction via Oldham, known as the Oldham Loop Line, ceased on 3 October 2009. The line was subsequently converted for Manchester Metrolink operation and reopened as a Metrolink route in 2012.

Northern Electrics was a brand offering electrified rail from Liverpool to Manchester.

Performance
Northern Rail won Public Transport Operator of the Year 2007 at the National Transport Awards and was praised by the judges for attracting 20% more passengers since 2004. When the extension of its franchise was announced, Northern Rail stated that it had improved punctuality from 83.7% in the 12 months to December 2004 to 91.6% in the 12 months to May 2010, meaning that around 200 more trains per day were on time than in 2004.

In the period 15 October 2009 to 14 November 2009, Northern's punctuality was 91.1% and reliability was 92.2%. Northern Rail's passenger charter targets were 91% for punctuality and 99% for reliability.

The franchise agreement commits to a 15% reduction in delays in the first five years and to a new 'incentive/penalty regime' and a more 'local focus on performance'.

The latest official figures released by NR (Network Rail) rate punctuality (PPM) at 91.9% and an MAA of 90.7% for period 7 (2013/2014) and the 12 months up to 12 October 2013.

The annual report for 2012, published in March 2013, of the Nederlandse Spoorwegen stated that Northern Rail transported 263,000 passengers daily. The customer satisfaction decreased to 80%. In May 2011 Northern Rail received the "Sustainable Business of the Year" award.

Criticism

Approach to fare evasion
Northern Rail had a reputation for its rather tough approach on fare evasion, and was known to take passengers to court for underpaying by a matter of pence.

Rolling stock
Northern Rail operated a large diesel fleet, which was used on most services. There was also a smaller electric fleet used on shorter distance services around Leeds and Manchester and on services between Liverpool and Manchester.

Northern Rail inherited a fleet of Class 142, 144, 150, 153, 155, 156 and 158 diesel multiple units and Class 321, 323 and 333 electric multiple units from Arriva Trains Northern and First North Western.

In October 2006 Northern Rail leased six former Central Trains Class 158s that had been on loan to First Great Western.

In March 2007 Northern Rail announced it would be acquiring a further 30 Class 158s from Arriva Trains Wales, Central Trains and First Great Western to replace 26 Class 142 Pacers. In the event, Northern Rail received only 19 Class 158s, but did gain eight centre carriages from East Midlands Trains in 2008 that were inserted into Northern's ex-First North Western Class 158s. Twelve of the Class 142s were placed in store, then sublet to First Great Western from late 2007; five were returned to Northern Rail in the autumn of 2008 with the remaining seven following in the autumn of 2011.

From July 2011 Northern Rail received 18 Class 150s from London Midland. In 2011, Northern Rail received the five former Stansted Express Class 322s from First ScotRail.

Fleet at end of franchise

Stations
In 2009, Northern Rail operated 471 stations; more than any other train operating company in the UK. 
The number fell to 462 later in the same year following closure of the Oldham Loop Line, 
and increased to 463 by 2013. New stations include Buckshaw Parkway in 2011, and James Cook in 2014. By 2013, trains operated by Northern Rail called at 526 stations.

Depots

The maintenance depots used by Northern Rail were located at:

The train crew depots were located at:

To run the Cleethorpes to Barton service, one class 153 was stabled at Cleethorpes overnight and was cleaned, the train crew which ran the service were First TransPennine Express staff.

References

External links

Official website

|-

Defunct train operating companies
Regional rail in the United Kingdom
Companies based in Manchester
Nederlandse Spoorwegen
Railway companies established in 2004
Railway companies disestablished in 2016
Serco
2004 establishments in England
2016 disestablishments in England
History of transport in Greater Manchester